{{DISPLAYTITLE:C16H16O3}}
The molecular formula C16H16O3 (molar mass: 256.296 g/mol, exact mass: 256.109944 u) may refer to:

 Calostomal
 2,2-Dimethoxy-2-phenylacetophenone
 Orchinol, a phenanthrenoid found in orchids
 Pterostilbene, a stilbenoid

Molecular formulas